UFC 105: Couture vs. Vera was a mixed martial arts event held by the Ultimate Fighting Championship (UFC) on November 14, 2009 in Manchester, United Kingdom at the Manchester Evening News Arena. This event aired on the same day, via tape delay, on Spike in the U.S.

Background

A previously rumoured Lightweight Championship bout between B.J. Penn and Diego Sanchez did not take place at this event. At the UFC 102 press conference, White said it was likely that the fight will be moved to a third event in November which was at the time still unannounced. It was later announced that the bout would take place at UFC 107.

A bout between Antônio Rogério Nogueira and Luiz Arthur Cane was moved to UFC 106. Dong Hyun Kim was forced to pull out of his bout with Dan Hardy due to an injury. He was replaced by Mike Swick.

The winner of Mike Swick vs. Dan Hardy was said to receive a title shot at Georges St-Pierre in early 2010. This fight took place at UFC 111. A previously announced bout between Peter Sobotta and DaMarques Johnson was cancelled due to a military commitment for Sobotta.

UFC 105 drew an average of 2.9 million viewers on Spike TV.

Results

Bonus awards
Fighters were awarded $40,000 bonuses.

Fight of the Night: Michael Bisping vs. Denis Kang
Knockout of the Night: Dennis Siver
Submission of the Night: Terry Etim

See also
 Ultimate Fighting Championship
 List of UFC champions
 List of UFC events
 2009 in UFC

References

External links
Official UFC past events page
UFC events results at Sherdog.com

Ultimate Fighting Championship events
2009 in mixed martial arts
Mixed martial arts in the United Kingdom
Sports competitions in Manchester
2009 in English sport